The Kogi, or Cogui, or Kágaba, meaning "jaguar" in the Kogi language, are an indigenous group that resides in the Sierra Nevada de Santa Marta mountains in northern Colombia. Their culture has continued since the Pre-Columbian era.

Language
The Kogi language belongs to the Chibchan family.

History
The Kogi people are descendants of the Tairona culture, which flourished before the times of the Spanish conquest. The Tairona were an advanced civilization which built many stone structures and pathways in the jungles. They made many gold objects which they would hang from trees and around their necks. They lived not much differently from modern day Kogi. Before the Spanish conquistadors arrived, the Tairona were forced to move into the highlands when the Caribs invaded around 1000 CE. The decision to flee to the mountains proved beneficial and strategic by the time the Spanish entered modern-day Colombia in the 15th century. 

Later, missionaries came and also began to influence their way of life, building chapels and churches amidst their villages to train and convert the locals. In the years since, the Kogi have remained in their home in the mountains, which allows them to escape the worst effects of colonisation and aids them in preserving their traditional way of life.

Spiritual beliefs

The Kogi base their lifestyles on their belief in "Aluna" or "The Great Mother," their creator figure, who they believe is the force behind nature. The Kogi understand the Earth to be a living being, and see humanity as its "children." They say that our actions of exploitation, devastation, and plundering for resources is weakening "The Great Mother" and leading to our destruction.

Like many other indigenous tribes, the Kogi people honor a holy mountain which they call "Gonawindua," otherwise known as Pico Cristóbal Colón. They believe that this mountain is "The Heart of the World" and they are the "Elder Brothers" who care for it. They also say that the outside civilization is the "Younger Brothers" who were sent away from The Heart of the World long ago.

From birth the Kogi attune members of their society called Mamos (which means sun in Kogi), for guidance, healing, and leadership. The Mamos are not to be confused with shamans or curers but to be regarded as tribal priests who hold highly respected roles in Kogi society. Mamos undergo strict training to assume this role. Selected male children are taken from birth and put in a dark cave for the first nine years of their lives to begin this training.  In the cave, elder Mamos and the child's mother care for, feed, train, and teach the child to attune to "Aluna" before the boy enters the outside world.

Through deep concentration, symbolic offerings, and divination, the Mamos believe they support the balance of harmony and creativity in the world.  It is also in this realm that the essence of agriculture is nurtured: seeds are blessed in Aluna before being planted, to ensure they grow successfully; marriage is blessed to ensure fertility; and ceremonies are offered to the different spirits of the natural world before performing tasks such as harvest and building of new huts.

The Kogi Mamos have remained isolated from the rest of the world since the Spanish Conquistadors. In order to preserve their traditional way of life, they rarely interact with the modern world or with outside civilization. Outsiders are not allowed inside their ancestral lands. Only men may interact with outsiders. The Kogi Mamos say that the balance of the earth's ecology has been suffering due to the modern-day devastation of resources by Younger Brother. The Kogi Mamos in turn believe that their work as Elder Brother is instrumental in helping to prolong and protect life on earth.

In a desperate attempt to prevent further ecological catastrophe and destruction, the Kogi Mamos broke their silence and allowed a small BBC film crew into their isolated mountaintop civilization to hear their message and warning to Younger Brother. The subsequent messages and warnings were voiced in the documentary . After the documentary was filmed, the Kogi Mamos returned to their work in isolation and asked outsiders not to come to their land.

The Kogi soon realized that their message and warning had not been heeded by Younger Brother, and instead, as they had predicted, many catastrophes occurred and the natural world continued to be devastated at an even more rapid pace. In turn they contacted the same filmmaker twenty years later to give one final message. This became Aluna, a documentary made by the Kogi Mamos themselves in which they give a second warning and say that they have chosen to share their secret sciences with Younger Brother so that Younger Brother can help change the world for the better.

Cosmology and socio-religious concepts 
Traditional Kogi religion is closely related to the structure of the cosmic universe that exists in dualistic expressions.  On a cosmic level, the sun separates the universe into two hemispheres: the east/west and consequently a right/left. The Kogi use this dualistic notion to elaborate on a number of earthly divides: man/woman, male/female, heat/cold, light/dark, and right/left. They believe each of these groupings are complementary opposites. Within each pair, one cannot survive without the other. In the case of good(right)/evil(left), the Kogi believe committing a sin once in a while serves as a justification for the existence of good. These natural opposites are a way to keep the society balanced or "in agreement" (yuluka).

The two hemispheres are then divided into four segments: North/South/East/West. Within these four points of reference, the Kogi have associated the orientation of their religious framework into South/East as good/light and North/West as evil/dark. This cosmic structure has influenced four entrances to each village, four principal clans, and has divided the Sierra Nevada into four sections. Following this concept, the Kogi have structured the ceremonial houses and sacred offering sites into four quadrants. In the ceremonial house, a line is drawn down the middle of a circle, which divides the men into a left side where men "know more", and a complementary right side of men who "know less".

In a system of four quadrants, the four lines inevitably meet in the center, creating a fifth dimension to the cosmic universe. The central point holds great significance to the Kogi people. It represents the center of the universe, the Sierra Nevada de Santa Marta. During the ceremony, this is the point where the Mamo buries the four sacred offerings and "speaks with god". In the center of the circle, he places a tiny stool upon the spot where he receives and answers questions of the cosmic universe.

In Kogi cosmology, they have added three dimensions to the standard N/S/E/W: Zenith, Nadir and the Center. This fixed system of points resembles an egg, and is formulated into nine stages/layers of development. Mother Goddess, the creator of the universe and mankind, created the cosmic egg. The horizontal layers of the egg are divided into two sections of four worlds with mankind (the 5th layer) residing in the center. The cosmic egg also represents the uterus of Mother Goddess and the Sierra Nevada. Because of this, the Kogi have built the structure of the ceremonial house as a replica of the cosmos.

Funerary customs
The Mamos participate in various rituals to celebrate the individual's life cycle from birth to death. These ceremonies include offerings, dances, and other ritual affairs. Although every life cycle is celebrated, emphasis on burial customs has been of much importance to the Kogi people. In this tribe, death is not viewed as a tragic event but as a "fulfillment of life". The burial process usually lasts approximately two hours and is performed without prayers and chants. To an outside viewer, the ritual might seem simple or without depth for such a spiritual tribe. What the viewer does not realize is that the funerary customs have philosophic concepts and deeper underlying meanings beyond the dimension of the western world.

Burial rites are an act of "cosmification". When a person dies, the Mamos return him/her back to the uterus of Mother Goddess.

The list below dictates eight components of the burial ritual analyzed by anthropologist Gerardo Reichel-Dolmatoff.

 Verbalization of the cemetery as the "village of Death" and as the "ceremonial house of Death"; verbalization of the burial pit as a "house" and as a "uterus".
 Flexed position of the corpse, placed in a carrying net, with a rope tied to the hair.
 The net represents the placenta of the uterus, which is connected by an umbilical cord (rope) that is cut after nine days. This allows the person to be rebirthed into another world.
 Corpse resting on the left side and with the head orientated toward the east.
 The east is the direction of the sun and light of the universe.
 Marked emphasis on right and left: position of hands; position of the corpse; left turns and right turns.
 As the person is turned, it creates the movement of the cosmic axis.
 Placing of offerings at the sides, the center and the top of the burial pit.
 This placement relates to the sacred points: North/South/East/West/Zenith/Nadir/Center
 Verbalization of the offerings as "food for the dead".
 The dead not only consist of ancestors, but also mythical beings of the masters of plants and animals. Eating this offering has a close relationship with sexual intercourse. The food symbolizes male semen and also the fertilization of the supernatural being and thus serves a way to multiply the offering. For example, if an offering is made to the Mother of Maize, the found constitutes as nourishment and an incentive to procreate more maize.
 Attitude of "opening" and "closing the home".
 Purification by turning.
 By rapidly turning the corpse, one becomes invisible and invulnerable to Death. For nine days and nights, the soul wanders on a journey that ends in the rebirth of that soul.

Traditions
The Kogi have many characteristics that define their culture. For example, all Kogi men receive a "poporo" when they come of age. The "poporo" is a small, hollow gourd that is filled with "lima," a type of powder that is made by heating and crushing shells to produce lime. The men also continuously chew coca leaves, a tradition followed by many indigenous tribes to connect them to the natural world. As they chew the coca leaves, they suck on the lime powder in their poporos, which they extract with a stick, and rub the mixture on the gourd with the stick to form a hardened layer or crust. The size of this layer depends on the maturity and the age of the Kogi man.

Kogi men and women all carry traditional bags across their shoulders. Only women are allowed to weave the bags. Many of the things carried inside a bag are secret and known only to the owner. Bags carried by Mamos contain sacred traditional objects. When two Kogi men meet, they use the customary greeting, which is to exchange handfuls of coca.

Lifestyle
Kogi men and women alike have simple modes of dress. The women pick, card, and spin wool and cotton while men do the weaving of the cloth. Clothing for men consists of a tunic and simple pants tied with a string at the waist. Clothing for women consists of a single length of cloth wrapped around their bodies as a dress. The Kogi all wear only pure white clothing. They say that white represents the Great Mother and therefore the purity of nature.

The Kogi live in a series of villages, called Kuibolos, containing circular huts made of stone, mud, and palm leaves. Men live in a separate hut from the women and children. Each village contains a large hut called a "nuhue" or temple where only men are allowed. In the "nuhue" many things are discussed and decisions are made. Divination and concentration also occur in these temples. Women are not allowed because the Kogi believe that women are more connected to the Great Mother and have no need of entering the temple. There are also women priests in the villages.

All consultations are done with Mamos, and many of the decisions are based on their wisdom and knowledge. Many Kogi marriages are arranged by Mamos to ensure the most fruitful communities. Marriages are not forced, and the buying or selling of women is not permitted, although women as young as 14 can be married and have children. The Kogi do not allow the mistreatment of women, and it is not uncommon to find marriages that were not arranged, but the Kogi also disapprove of breaking arranged marriages.

Fields, houses, and livestock are passed from mother to daughter as well as from father to son, which is bilateral inheritance of these items. There is also the normal parallel descent of personal items, including ritual objects which are male property and descend patrilineally. But certain rights, names or associations descend matrilineally.

Common crops of trade are sugar and coffee. Much of the sugar is turned into "panela," a type of Colombian hardened brown sugar. The women do most of the planting of the vegetables, but farming is a responsibility of the whole family.

Contemporary Kogi
The Kogi practice agriculture using slash-and-burn farming methods; each family tends farms at varying altitudes of the Sierra, producing different crops to satisfy the range of their needs. They also raise cattle on the highlands.

The Kogi starred in and helped film-director Alan Ereira make the 2012 documentary film Aluna, a sequel to the BBC 1990 documentary  From the Heart of The World: Elder Brother's Warning, presented by Ereira himself. In it, they voice their concern to the people of the modern world (Younger Brother) about reckless ecosystem alteration and tomb desecration as a cause of  climate change and world destruction.

See also
 Arhuacos
 Juan Mayr
 Taironas
 Alan Ereira

References

Bibliography

External links

 Sewaluna Foundation
 Tairona Heritage Trust
 National Geographic article on the Indians of the Sierra Nevada Mountains
 Sacred Land Film Project
 TEDtalks, Wade Davis on endangered cultures, the Kogis at 8 minutes 10 seconds.
 
 "The Sierra Nevada Indians". Survival International.

Circum-Caribbean tribes
Indigenous peoples in Colombia
Cesar Department